Delias germana is a butterfly in the family Pieridae. It was described by Walter Karl Johann Roepke in 1955. It is found in New Guinea.

The wingspan is about 56 mm. Adults are similar to Delias eichhorni.

Subspecies
D. g. germana (Central Mountains, Irian Jaya)
D. g. heliophora Roepke 1955 (Paniaia, Irian Jaya)

References

External links
Delias at Markku Savela's Lepidoptera and Some Other Life Forms

germana
Butterflies described in 1955